Olga Mercedes Zammitt OBE, JP, (born 31 August 1940) is a retired Gibraltarian teacher and former Mayor of Gibraltar. She held office from 1 August 2009 to 31 July 2010.

Zammitt was appointed Officer of the Order of the British Empire (OBE) in the 2011 Birthday Honours for services to the community in Gibraltar.

References

Living people
Mayors of Gibraltar
Officers of the Order of the British Empire
Gibraltarian women in politics
1940 births